Carlos Galarreta Lázaro (born 10 November 1967) is a Spanish former road cyclist, who competed as a professional from 1990 to 1995. He most notably won the 1993 Vuelta a Murcia.

Major results
1990
 4th Overall Vuelta a Cantabria
1991
 3rd Overall Route du Sud
1st Stage 4
1993
 1st  Overall Vuelta a Murcia

Grand Tour general classification results timeline

References

External links

Living people
Spanish male cyclists
1967 births
People from Asón-Agüera
Cyclists from Cantabria